Furrah is a village in the Anantnag district of the disputed territory of Jammu and Kashmir. It has nearly 1500 households.

The village is located just 4 km away from main city of Anantnag. A railway line passes to one side of the village. Forah has more than 65% of literacy rate. This village is home to many high officials of bank, education department and other departments. Present president of J&K lecturer's form Dr. Manzoor ahmed rather belongs to this village.

Agriculture is the main industry of the village.

Location 
Forah is located 4 km south from district headquarters Anantnag. The nearby villages are:
 Ashajipora - 3 km
 Monghall - 1 km
 Lalan and Ganoora - 1 km
 Dialgam - 3 km
 Khanabal - 5 km

Forah is about 1.5 km from the [[National Highway 1A (India, old numbering
)|National Highway 1A]], which acts as a border between Anantnag and Kulgam district.

Demographics 
Kashmiri is the local language. Sandran is the only river flowing through the area.

Education

Colleges 
 Government Boys Degree College, Khanabal, Anantnag
 Government Degree College, Anantnag (for women)

Schools 
 Govt. Higher Secondary School, Forah, Anantnag
 Govt. Boys higher Secondary School, Anantnag
 Govt. Girls Higher Secondary School, Anantnag (Ranibagh)

Villages in Anantnag district